Eyasu Berhe Asemahegne (11 June 1956 – 18 January 2010) was an Ethiopian singer, writer, producer and poet who was one of the most popular and influential Tigrigna musical artists of the 20th century.

Early life 
Eyasu was born in Mekelle, where he attended primary and secondary school. Eyasu obtained his MA degree from Open University of the United Kingdom in Business Administration. He was studying for his PhD.

Music career 
Through music, Eyasu inspired many young men and women to join the TPLF during the Ethiopian Civil War.  Eyasu has played significant role in mobilizing the public for the bitter struggle and later joined the cultural group established by the TPLF. Over 70 to 80 percent of the group's songs, which conveyed political and social messages, were produced by Eyasu.

Death and legacy 
Eyasu died suddenly while performing onstage in Alamata. In April 2010, the Tigray Development Association announced plans to construct a library in his honor in Mekelle at a cost of 11 million Birr.

References 

1956 births
2010 deaths
20th-century Ethiopian male singers
Alumni of the Open University
People from Tigray Region
21st-century Ethiopian male singers